A steel beach picnic or steel beach party is a tradition in the United States Navy.  Such events are often department-sponsored barbecues held on the deck of the ship, hence the name "steel beach".  They are often held on the flight deck or in a large hangar bay for carriers, much like a day at the beach with volleyball and other sporting events.

See also
 Beer day

External links

United States Navy traditions
Military traditions
Picnic